Wes Wagner is an attorney who was a Democratic member of the Arkansas House of Representatives, for the 54th district in the northeastern portion of his state.

Wagner was unseated after a single term in the November 4, 2014 general election by the Republican Dave Wallace, a town council member in Leachville and a decorated United States Army officer in the Vietnam War.

In the 2016 election, Wagner switched parties, becoming a Republican and entering the primary election, where he narrowly lost to Johnny Rye.

References

External links
 
Legislative page

Arkansas Democrats
Arkansas Republicans
Living people
Members of the Arkansas House of Representatives
Politicians from Jonesboro, Arkansas
Arkansas State University alumni
University of Tulsa alumni
Year of birth missing (living people)